The New Jersey Historic Trust was created by the State of New Jersey in 1967 to preserve New Jersey's historic resources. The Historic Trust's executive director is Dorothy P. Guzzo.

Funding programs available through the New Jersey Historic Trust are 
The Garden State Historic Preservation Trust Fund, which provides matching grants for planning and capital projects related to the repair, restoration and rehabilitation of historic properties.
The Revolving Loan Fund offers low-interest, long-term financing for the repair, restoration and rehabilitation or purchase of historic properties.
The Emergency Grant and Loan Fund offers grants and loans, usually small in size, for emergency work on endangered historic properties
The Cultural Trust Capital Preservation Grant Program provides grants to historic and humanities-oriented organizations for the repair, restoration and rehabilitation of historic properties they own.

See also

New Jersey Historical Society
New Jersey Register of Historic Places
National Register of Historic Places listings in New Jersey
List of the oldest buildings in New Jersey
National Trust for Historic Preservation

External links
Official website
10 most funded projects since 2000

References

State history organizations of the United States
New Jersey culture
Historic preservation organizations in the United States
1999 establishments in New Jersey